The Rivers State Ministry of Social Welfare and Rehabilitation is a government ministry of Rivers State, Nigeria entrusted with the implementation of programs and the provision of social, rehabilitative services to improve the physical, social, emotional and economic well-being of the disadvantaged groups in the state. The Ministry is currently headed by Commissioner of Social Welfare and Rehabilitation Mrs. Inime Chinwenwo-Aguma.

VISION: To achieve a society where everyone is capable of functioning and achieving practical opportunities in the face of disadvantages

Departments: 1.Social Welfare 2.Rehabilitation 3.Child Welfare 4.Administration 5.Finance and Accounts 6.Planning, Research and Statistics

Emergency Hotline: 07040410523; 07040410081

Zonal Offices : Abua Odual, Ahaoda East, Bonny, Bori, Degema, Eleme, Ikwerre, Ohio Akkor, Okehi, Opobo, Sokana, Oba/Egbema/Ndoni, Okrika.

See also
List of government ministries of Rivers State

References

Social Welfare and Rehabilitation
Social affairs ministries
Welfare in Nigeria